Melicope bonwickii, commonly known as the yellow evodia or yellow corkwood, is a species of tree in the family Rutaceae and is native to Java and the Philippines, and southward to New Guinea and north-eastern Australia. It has trifoliate leaves and small pink flowers borne in panicles in leaf axils.

Description
There are four stamens.

Taxonomy
This species was first formally described in 1865 by Ferdinand von Mueller who gave it the name Euodia bonwickii and published the description in Fragmenta phytographiae Australiae from specimens collected by John Dallachy. In 1994, Thomas Gordon Hartley changed the name to Melicope bonwickii in the journal Sandakania. The specific epithet (bonwickii) honours James Bonwick.

Distribution and habitat
Melicope bonwickii occurs naturally in Java and the Philippines, and southward to New Guinea and north-eastern Australia. In Australia it is found from the Atherton Tableland to near Proserpine in northern Queensland.

Uses
This species is said to be used to treat dysentery in the Tanimbar Islands.

References

bonwickii
Trees of Java
Trees of Borneo
Trees of Malesia
Trees of New Guinea
Trees of Australia
Plants described in 1865
Taxa named by Ferdinand von Mueller